Allāhumma is a term of address for Allah, the Islamic and Arabic term for one God. It is translated as "O Allāh" and is seen as the equivalent of "Yā Allāh".  Some grammarians (such as Sibawayh) argue that it is an abbreviation of يا ألله أمّنا بخير (yā ʾallāhu ʾummanā bi-khayr) (with the meaning of "O God, lead us in goodness"); others have argued without explanation that the suffix  ـ مَّ (-mma) takes the place of yā (O).  Muslim scholar Ibn ʿĀshūr, in his explanation of Sūrat ʾĀl ʿImrān, suggests that the word Allāhumma is of Hebrew or of Qaḥṭāni derivation.

See also
 List of Islamic terms in Arabic
 Dua Allahumma kun li-waliyyik

References

Allah
Arabic grammar
Arabic words and phrases
Islamic terminology
Etymologies